{{DISPLAYTITLE:C17H27N3O17P2}}
The molecular formula C17H27N3O17P2 (molar mass: 607.354 g/mol) may refer to:

 Uridine diphosphate N-acetylgalactosamine
 Uridine diphosphate N-acetylglucosamine

Molecular formulas